Jeremy Shearmur (born 13 June 1948) is a British former reader in philosophy in the School of Philosophy at the Australian National University, who retired at the end of 2013. He is currently an emeritus fellow, lives in Dumfries, Scotland, and is undertaking research and a limited amount of lecturing and Ph.D. supervision. He was educated at the London School of Economics.

He has taught at the University of Edinburgh, the University of Manchester, and at George Mason University, where he was a research associate professor at the Institute for Humane Studies. He was also director of studies of the Centre for Policy Studies, in London.

After briefly pursuing studies in librarianship, he worked for eight years as assistant to Karl Popper.

Works

References

External links 
ANU Profile
 
 Shearmur, Jeremy: at Online Library of Liberty

Academic staff of the Australian National University
Living people
Critical rationalists
1948 births